"You're Still Beautiful to Me" is a song written by Bryan Adams and Robert John "Mutt" Lange and recorded by Adams for his 1996 studio album 18 til I Die. The song was covered by American country music artist Bryan White and released in June 1999 as the first single from his album How Lucky I Am. The song reached number 39 on the Billboard Hot Country Singles & Tracks chart.

Chart performance

References

1996 songs
1999 singles
Bryan Adams songs
Bryan White songs
Songs written by Bryan Adams
Songs written by Robert John "Mutt" Lange
Asylum Records singles